Kaaki Sattai is the soundtrack album for the 2015 Tamil film of the same name co-written and directed by R. S. Durai Senthilkumar and produced by Dhanush, their second collaboration after Ethir Neechal (2013). The film features Sivakarthikeyan and Sri Divya in the lead roles, while Prabhu and Vijay Raaz play supporting roles. The film's music was composed by Anirudh Ravichander, featured seven songs written by Na. Muthukumar, Yugabharathi, Anthony Daasan, Arunraja Kamaraj and Brodha V. The album was launched on 12 December 2014, coinciding with Rajinikanth's birthday, to positive reviews.

Development
In July 2014, Anirudh started recording for the film's songs, along with the works in Vijay's Kaththi (2014). In a Facebook chat session during September 2014, Anirudh stated that the work on the film's songs have been completed and will be out for release. By early-September, two songs from the film — "I'm So Cool" and "Kadhal Kan Kattudhe" — were shot in Norway. Besides acting, Sivakarthikeyan had also sung the romantic track "I'm So Cool" with Anirudh, his third song after the titular track for Varuthapadatha Valibar Sangam (2013) and "Royapuram Peter" from Maan Karate (2014). The latter was sung by Shakthisree Gopalan, in his first association with his co-singer Anirudh. Brodha V penned and sung the English rap verses for the track "Shake That". By January 2015, Anirudh had completed working on the final mixing and mastering of the film's background score.

Track listing
Before the film's audio launch, the album was made available through iTunes on 10 December 2014. The official track list was released on the same day, which featured seven tracks.

Release 
The album was initially scheduled to release on 14 November 2014, which was confirmed to be false. With the first look being released on 26 November, Anirudh released the theme music of the film, through his SoundCloud channel on 28 November. It was reported that the audio will be released on 5 December, but the release was postponed as Anirudh had to complete one track before the scheduled release. The producers finally announced that the album will be launched on 12 December 2014 to coincide actor Rajinikanth's birthday, and also with the release of Lingaa (2014). Promos of the audio tracks were released starting from 8 December. 

The album was released at the Radio Mirchi FM Station, with the attendance of the cast and crew. Initially, Sony Music was reported to bag the film's audio rights and distribute the album, but the soundtrack was released through Wunderbar Studios (a subsidiary of the film's production company Wunderbar Films) and Divo as the digital partner. Shaheer Munir, the managing director of Divo, had stated that "the film's music rights had been in demand with offers pouring from leading labels, but Dhanush's belief in value of music rights and especially of his prodigy Anirudh, made him retain the rights and release under his label." As a part of promotions, lyrical videos from the album were premiered through Sun Music, soon after the album's release. Post the album release, on 26 January 2015, an instrumental track titled "Mathimaaran Instinct" was released through the composer's YouTube channel.

Reception

Upon its release on iTunes on 10 December, the album topped the national charts within hours after its release. It eventually became the composer's seventh album to do so. The soundtrack, received positive responses from critics. Nicy V.P. of International Business Times stated that "Anirudh comes up with another set of impressive songs". IndiaGlitz rated the album 3.75 stars out of 5, saying that "Anirudh plays to his potential to continue his winning streak". Behindwoods rated the album 2.75 out of 5, feeling that the "expectation from Anirudh is unfortunately way higher". Moviecrow gave 3 out of 5 stars to the album saying "Kakki Sattai perhaps, is the album which has the most number of EDM sets/sounds in the entire of Anirudh’s discography.  Anirudh has decided to give priority to the mixing over composing this time, and it is expected to pay off quite well." Studioflicks called it as an "exciting" soundtrack. Siddharth Srinivas, in his review for Sify gave 3.5 out of 5 and summarised "Anirudh’s music has evolved over his albums with impressive variety and sound mixing. The composer delivers yet another exciting album for Sivakarthikeyan." Karthik Srinivasan of Milliblog stated "Anirudh’s music is now getting into a signature style – that’s not entirely comforting." Cinepunch gave the album 3.75 out of 5 saying "Anirudh steals the hearts, yet again with his fabulous music".

Legacy 
The track "Kadhal Kan Kattuthe" later inspired a 2017 film of the same name, starring debutants KG and Athulya Ravi.

References

External links 
 

2014 soundtrack albums
Tamil film soundtracks
Anirudh Ravichander soundtracks